Patrick "Spark" Shaughnessy is the President and CEO of AVI Communications, Inc. in Lewisville, Texas and owner of Spark Shaughnessy and Associates, LLC, Dallas, Texas.

Patrick has won numerous awards including a Clio, a Gold Medal for film production from the New York Film Festival, and he also served as Executive Producer of one of the largest corporate shows ever, The Coca-Cola Centennial Celebration with an audience of 14,000 bottlers from 140 countries.

Patrick has completed nine marathons and is a father of seven children.  He and his wife, Nancy, currently reside in Dallas, Texas.

Biography 

Patrick, aka "Spark", has spent his entire 40 year career in media. He began work in Omaha, Nebraska in radio advertising sales, which led to management and later to his becoming VP & General Manager of a Los Angeles radio station. After seven years in L.A. he was recruited by Roy Disney to head up TM Communications in Dallas, Texas which he later bought from Disney. TM produced award-winning syndicated radio shows, advertising campaigns, corporate shows, and owned radio stations, too. After selling TM and his radio stations he formed AVI Communications, Inc. in 1991 which produced and syndicated worldwide video sales training programs for radio, TV, and Cable companies hosted by NY Times Best Selling Author, Jason Jennings . He has also syndicated golf tips for TV stations featuring such golf greats as Ben Crenshaw, Tom Kite, Byron Nelson, and Butch Harmon. For the past nine years AVI has also developed millions of dollars in new business for TV stations through its Brand Your Business seminars and by creating ad campaigns for advertisers. In addition, he recently founded a literary/talent agency.  Although the agency is new, Spark and his associates have a marketing history of giving birth to a wide range of creative work.

AVI Communications, Inc. 

AVI Communications, Inc. in Lewisville, TX is a private company categorized under Studio Equipment, Radio and Television Broadcasting. It was established in 1991 and incorporated in Texas.

AVI Communications serves broadcasters with Quantum DVD sales training, and a variety of other new business development services for broadcasters and their advertisers.

AVI Communications also provides and conducts "Brand Your Business" seminars throughout the United States for television stations and their local clientele.

Spark Shaughnessy and Associates, LLC 

"Representing Outstanding Individuals with Extraordinary Talent"

Spark Shaughnessy & Associates is a new and emerging boutique agency born out of a personal history and desire to help others realize their potential through literary, film, video, and other performance oriented creative endeavors.

The firm's criteria for selecting and representing clients are the following: the client must be likeable, talented, flexible, patient, and collaborative.  In addition, he or she must have a unique enough story, persona, and/or idea that will either help others or be entertaining and preferably have the potential for much more i.e. spawning other products or line extensions.

References

External links 
 http://www.linkedin.com/pub/patrick-%22spark%22-shaughnessy/7/358/366
 http://sparkshaughnessy.com/
 http://www.avi-communications.com/

Year of birth missing (living people)
Living people
American chief executives